Amorbimorpha spadicea is a species of moth of the family Tortricidae. It is found in Guerrero, Mexico.

The length of the forewings is about 13 mm. The ground colour of the forewings is brick reddish brown. The hindwings are shining straw white. Adults have been recorded on wing in August.

References

Moths described in 1913
Sparganothini
Moths of Central America